The 2016 Verizon IndyCar Series was the 21st season of the IndyCar Series and the 105th season of American open wheel racing. It included the 100th running of the Indianapolis 500. Scott Dixon entered as the reigning Drivers' Champion, while Chevrolet entered the season as the reigning Manufacturer's Champion.  Upon season's end, Simon Pagenaud was crowned Drivers' Champion, while Chevrolet retained the Manufacturer's Championship. Simon Pagenaud was the first European driver to win IndyCar Series driver's title since British driver Dario Franchitti in 2011 season.

Entries

Notes 
Bryan Clauson ran the Indianapolis 500 for the 3rd and final time for Jonathan Byrd's Racing. Clauson would attempt to race in more than 200 races in 2016 among IndyCar, sprint cars and midgets but would tragically fall short of that because on August 6, 2016, Clauson was involved in a midget car crash at Belleville High Banks Speedway in Belleville, Kansas, and died the following night.
Ryan Hunter-Reay, Carlos Muñoz and Marco Andretti signed with Andretti Autosport for the 2016 and 2017 seasons. The team confirmed Townsend Bell for the Indianapolis 500.
Carpenter Fisher Hartman Racing became Ed Carpenter Racing for the 2016 season. Both Josef Newgarden and Ed Carpenter remained with the team, with only Newgarden running the full schedule. The team confirmed J. R. Hildebrand for the GP of Indy and the Indianapolis 500. ECR would add Indy Lights champion Spencer Pigot to drive the No. 20 for the road/street courses beginning at Detroit.
Rahal Letterman Lanigan Racing ran only one car full-time in 2016 with Graham Rahal, but ran Indy Lights champion Spencer Pigot in three races (St. Petersburg, GP of Indy, and Indianapolis 500).
Team Penske returned with the same four drivers as the 2015 season.
Chip Ganassi Racing retained Scott Dixon, Tony Kanaan and Charlie Kimball, but neither Sage Karam nor Sebastián Saavedra returned to the team. The team later confirmed former Manor Marussia driver Max Chilton, who drove a partial Indy Lights schedule in 2015, as their fourth driver.
Schmidt Peterson Motorsports confirmed the return of James Hinchcliffe to the team. Mikhail Aleshin returned to the team for the full season, replacing James Jakes. Oriol Servià drove the team's third entry in the Indianapolis 500 with support from Marotti Racing.
PIRTEK Team Murray confirmed that the team would race the Grand Prix of Indianapolis and Indianapolis 500 with driver Matthew Brabham. The team had support from KVSH Racing.
KVSH Racing confirmed the return of Sébastien Bourdais with the team. Stefano Coletti did not return for the team. Stefan Wilson drove the No. 25 for the Indianapolis 500.
Dale Coyne Racing confirmed that Conor Daly and Luca Filippi would run the full season. Pippa Mann returned to the team for the Indianapolis 500. The team confirmed Gabby Chaves for the Grand Prix of Indianapolis and Indianapolis 500.
A. J. Foyt Enterprises confirmed the return of Takuma Sato and Jack Hawksworth to the team. The team confirmed Alex Tagliani for the Grand Prix of Indy and the Indianapolis 500.
Dreyer & Reinbold Racing reunited with Sage Karam for the Indianapolis 500.
Lazier Partners Racing confirmed the return of Buddy Lazier to the Indianapolis 500.
 On February 18, Bryan Herta Autosport confirmed their alliance with fellow Honda team Andretti Autosport. The team was run out of Andretti's shop in Indianapolis. Separately, due to a sponsor default, the team was unable to retain 2014 Indy Lights Champion Gabby Chaves. The team would confirm former Caterham and Manor Racing driver Alexander Rossi to drive the No. 98 for the season.
IndyCar announced on February 24, 2016, the hiring of three race stewards; former drivers Arie Luyendyk and Max Papis and longtime motorsports executive Dan Davis.
On May 15, 2016, information was revealed that Charlie Kimball would be using car number 42 instead of his usual 83 for the Indianapolis 500. This came as a promotion by Novo Nordisk and Chip Ganassi Racing that also involved Kyle Larson and Ganassi's NASCAR team. The official announcement came May 16, 2016
On June 12, 2016, Josef Newgarden suffered a fractured clavicle and wrist in an accident during the Firestone 600. Ed Carpenter Racing announced the following day that J. R. Hildebrand would fill in for Newgarden until he recovered from his injuries. However, Newgarden recovered enough from his injuries that he was able to compete in the following race at Road America.
On July 21, 2016, Dale Coyne Racing announced that R. C. Enerson would make his IndyCar debut driving for the team at Mid-Ohio. The team later signed Enerson to drive the final two races of the season.

Schedule 
The 2016 Verizon IndyCar Series schedule was announced on October 27, 2015. All rounds were held in the United States, except the Toronto round.

 Oval/Speedway
 Road course/Street circuit

Schedule changes and notes 
The Grand Prix of Boston was announced in late May 2015. The race was scheduled to be run on Labor Day Weekend on September 4, 2016. The proposed street circuit was based in the Boston Seaport District. On April 29, 2016, Boston newspapers reported that the race had been canceled.
Grand Prix of St. Petersburg was run on March 11–13.
Autódromo Hermanos Rodríguez was also rumored to start the 2016 season with a race in February, but did not materialize.
IndyCar did not return to NOLA Motorsports Park, Auto Club Speedway, and the Milwaukee Mile in 2016 following financial difficulties exposed shortly after the 2015 running of the former event.
Toronto returned to its original July date as a single race weekend.
 Road America's return to an open-wheel calendar was announced on August 8, 2015. The race was run on June 26, 2016.
IndyCar returned to Phoenix International Raceway for the first time since 2005.
IndyCar officials explored the possibility of returning to Gateway Motorsports Park; a deal was eventually reached for the track to return for the 2017 season.
Texas Motor Speedway confirmed that the Verizon IndyCar Series would run on June 11, 2016. However, the race was postponed to the following afternoon due to persistent rain. It was further halted after 71 laps due to more rain and the rest of the race was postponed until August 27. The 248 lap race resumed starting at lap 72. This would lead to updates for the track regarding drainage and repaving in time for 2017's events.
IndyCar returned to Pocono Raceway on August 21. 
In an interview with Mark Miles, Iowa Speedway was said to be set for July 10.
In a November 2 press release, IndyCar announced a two-day promoter test at Phoenix International Raceway, scheduled for February 26–27, in preparation for the series’ return to the 1-mile oval. The Phoenix promoter test in February was the only one not in conjunction with a typical race weekend schedule. The other promoter test days were: March 11 at St. Petersburg, April 22 at Barber Motorsports Park, May 12 at the Indianapolis Motor Speedway road course, June 24 at Road America, July 29 at Mid-Ohio Sports Car Course, and September 16 at Sonoma Raceway.
IndyCar CEO Mark Miles said in an interview that IndyCar was working on replacing the Boston race on Labor Day and specifically stated that Gateway Motorsports Park and Watkins Glen International were being considered as replacement venues. On May 13, 2016, IndyCar announced that Watkins Glen would replace Boston.

Results

Points standings 

 Ties are broken by number of wins, followed by number of 2nds, 3rds, etc., then by number of pole positions, followed by number of times qualified 2nd, etc.

Driver standings 

 One championship point is awarded to each driver who leads at least one race lap. Two additional championship points are awarded to the driver who leads most laps during a race.
 At all races except the Indy 500, the number 1 qualifier earns one point.
 Entrant-initiated engine change-outs before the engines reach their required distance run will result in the loss of ten points.

Entrant standings 

 Based on the entrant, used for oval qualifications order, and starting grids when qualifying is cancelled.
 Only full-time entrants, and at-large part-time entrants shown.

Manufacturer standings 

 The top three finishing drivers from each manufacturer in each race/qualifying score championship points for their respective manufacturer, provided they were using one of their four allotted engines.
 Two additional points are awarded to the manufacturer if one of their entrants leads most laps of a race.
 At all races except the Indy 500, the manufacturer who qualifies on pole earns one point.
 Manufacturers will earn ten points for each engine reaching the 2500-mile change-out threshold. Manufacturers will lose twenty points for each engine failing to reach the change-out threshold, or for a non-minor repair requiring a component change.
 Ties are broken by number of wins, followed by number of 2nds, 3rds, etc., then by number of pole positions, followed by number of times qualified 2nd, etc.

Footnotes

See also 
 2016 Indy Lights
 2016 Pro Mazda Championship
 2016 U.S. F2000 National Championship

References

External links 
 

 
IndyCar Series seasons
IndyCar Series
IndyCar Series